It Takes Two is an action-adventure platform video game developed by Hazelight Studios and published by Electronic Arts. It was released for PlayStation 4, PlayStation 5, Windows, Xbox One, and Xbox Series X/S in March 2021, and was released for Nintendo Switch in November 2022. Like Hazelight's debut game A Way Out, it does not have a single-player option. It is playable only in either online or local split screen cooperative multiplayer between two players.

It Takes Two received favorable reviews from critics and won multiple year-end accolades, including the Game of the Year at The Game Awards 2021 and the 25th Annual D.I.C.E. Awards. The game was a commercial success, with more than 10 million copies sold by February 2023.

Gameplay
It Takes Two is an action-adventure video game with elements from platform games. It is specifically designed for split-screen cooperative multiplayer, which means that it must be played with another player through either local or online play. The game features a large number of game mechanics from various video game genres. These gameplay mechanics are connected to the story and the theme of the level. For instance, in one level, Cody gains the ability to rewind time, whereas May can replicate herself. Players have to cooperate with each other and utilize these abilities in order to progress. The game also features a large number of minigames.

Plot
Cody (Joseph Balderrama) and May (Annabelle Dowler), a married couple, are planning on getting a divorce. After telling their daughter Rose (Clare Corbett) the news, she takes her hand-made dolls, which look like her parents, into the family shed and tries to repair their relationship by play-acting. The parents find themselves trapped inside the dolls' bodies as a consequence of Rose's tears landing on the dolls. Dr. Hakim, who has assumed the anthropomorphic form of his relationship therapy book, tells May and Cody that he has been given the job of trying to fix their relationship as they try to reach Rose.

At first, Cody and May are more focused on trying to reach Rose, who they hope knows of a way to return them to their human bodies. However, Hakim continually interferes with their progress, often putting obstacles and tests in their way to force them to collaborate to progress. They also come across anthropomorphic versions of their old possessions, who criticize Cody and May for their mistreatment and negligence of both their possessions and Rose. As they travel all around their property, Cody and May are reminded of the positive memories they had together, as well as what originally drew them together to become a couple, and learn to work together and collaborate to move forward in their journey.

In a final series of obstacles, Hakim encourages Cody and May to rediscover their passions and support each other. This first takes them on an adventure through Cody's overgrown, abandoned garden and greenhouse, which May helps him to restore. They then work together to help May rediscover her passion for music and singing.

Meanwhile, Rose continues to do her best to mend the relationship between her parents, but both Cody and May's real bodies have fallen unconscious and will not respond to her. Thinking her parents are ignoring her, Rose comes to believe that she is the reason their marriage is falling apart and decides to run away in hopes that will make them stay together.

After a long journey, Cody and May finally complete Hakim's final test, gathering an orchestra and audience for May to perform in front of. As May sings, the relationship between her and Cody is at last fully healed, and they kiss, which reverses the trance they are in. They reawaken in their real bodies and are shocked to learn that Rose has already run away. Fortunately, they are able to find her at a nearby bus stop and assure her that she is not the cause of their arguments and that they will always love her no matter what happens. The trio then returns home with a new perspective on their relationship.

Development
Josef Fares, the director of Hazelight's previous game A Way Out (2018) and Starbreeze's Brothers: A Tale of Two Sons (2013), returned and directed a team of 60 people to develop the game. After releasing A Way Out in 2018, the team decided to create another co-op only video game because it had a more experienced and refined team and the team felt that they could further improve  and expand the gameplay concepts introduced by A Way Out. The development team worked to ensure that the gameplay had connection with the narrative, and that as the story unfolds, the game's mechanics will change accordingly. Fares pushed his team to include as many mechanics and setpieces as possible since he believed that if a gameplay mechanic is used repeatedly, it will become "less special". Fares described the game as a "romantic comedy". Fares provided motion capture for Dr. Hakim, one of the key characters in the game. The game was written mostly in AngelScript, which was implemented into the Unreal Engine by Hazelight through their own plugin.

Like A Way Out, It Takes Two was published under Electronic Arts' EA Originals program. The program allowed Hazelight to retain full creative control while receiving most of the game's profit after development cost was recouped. EA first announced that it had signed a publishing deal with Hazelight in June 2019. The game was officially revealed during EA Play in June 2020. EA and Hazelight introduced Friend's Pass for the game, which allows the player who purchased the game to send invitations to their friends who can then play the game for free with the player. The game was released for PlayStation 4, PlayStation 5, Windows, Xbox One and Xbox Series X and Series S on March 26, 2021. A port by Turn Me Up Games for Nintendo Switch was announced in a Nintendo Direct in September 2022, and was released on 4 November 2022.

Take-Two trademark complaint
After the game was released, Hazelight Studios attempted to file a trademark for the name It Takes Two, but Take-Two Interactive filed a trademark complaint, arguing it was too close to their trademark on the words "take" and "two". Hazelight abandoned the trademark application of the name, making it difficult for them to engage in certain types of marketing, but the developers said they are "hopeful it will be resolved".

Reception 

According to review aggregator website Metacritic, It Takes Two received "generally favorable" reviews. It Takes Two was considered as one of the best games released in 2021 and the best couch co-op game of that year by many fans.

Sales
More than 1 million copies were sold a month after the game's launch. By June 17, 2021, over 2 million copies were sold. By October 2021, 3 million copies were sold. By February 2022, 5 million copies were sold. As of July 2022, 7 million copies have been sold. By February 2023, 10 million units had been sold.

Accolades

Adaptations
In January 2022, it was announced that adaptations in the form of both a feature film and television series were in development from Dimitri M. Johnson's dj2 Entertainment studios.

Film

A feature length film was officially in development beginning in January 2022, with Pat Casey and Josh Miller slated to be working on the screenplay for the film; while a multi-studio bidding war for distribution rights was ongoing. The project will include collaborative input from the video game's creative developer, Hazelight Studios. By April 2022, it was announced that Amazon had landed distribution rights, as part of a first-look deal between the company, dj2 Entertainment, and the screenwriters. The plot was confirmed to follow the basic premise of the game: lead characters May and Cody are a married couple considering divorce whose minds are inadvertently trapped in two dolls when their daughter starts crying. Together the couple must learn to work together, and regain their bodies. Dwayne Johnson, Dany Garcia, and Hiram Garcia joined the production in producing roles, alongside Dimitri M. Johnson and Dan Jevons. The project will be a joint-venture production between Hazelight Studios, dj2 Entertainment, Seven Bucks Productions, and Amazon Studios. Intended to be released via streaming as a Prime Video Original Film, Johnson is also being courted to star in the film.

Notes

References

External links
 

2021 video games
3D platform games
Action-adventure games
AIAS Game of the Year winners
Asymmetrical multiplayer video games
British Academy Games Award for Multiplayer winners
Cooperative video games
Electronic Arts games
Golden Joystick Award winners
Indie video games
Multiplayer video games
Nintendo Switch games
Platform games
PlayStation 4 games
PlayStation 5 games
Split-screen multiplayer games
The Game Award for Game of the Year winners
Unreal Engine games
Video games about magic
Video games about size change
Video games about toys
Video games developed in Sweden
Video games featuring female protagonists
Video games scored by Gustaf Grefberg
Windows games
Works about divorce
Xbox One games
Xbox Series X and Series S games